Pointe des Arcas is a mountain in the French Alps.

External links
Pointe des Arcas

Mountains of Hautes-Alpes
Mountains of the Alps
Alpine three-thousanders